Vella fallax is a species of antlion in the family Myrmeleontidae. It is found in the Caribbean Sea, Central America, North America, and South America.

Subspecies
These two subspecies belong to the species Vella fallax:
 Vella fallax fallax (Rambur, 1842)
 Vella fallax texana (Hagen, 1887)

References

Further reading

 
 

Acanthaclisini
Articles created by Qbugbot
Insects described in 1842